Mahāsthāmaprāpta is a bodhisattva mahāsattva who represents the power of wisdom. His name literally means "arrival of the great strength".

Mahāsthāmaprāpta is one of the Eight Great Bodhisattvas in Mahayana Buddhism, along with Mañjuśrī, Samantabhadra, Avalokiteśvara, Ākāśagarbha, Kṣitigarbha, Maitreya and Sarvanivarana-Vishkambhin.

In Chinese Buddhism, Mahasthamaprapta is sometimes portrayed as a woman, Shih Chih,  with a likeness similar to Avalokiteśvara. He is also one of the Thirteen Buddhas in the Japanese school of Shingon Buddhism. In Tibetan Buddhism, Mahāsthāmaprāpta is equated with Vajrapani, who is one of his incarnations and was known as the Protector of Gautama Buddha.

Mahāsthāmaprāpta is one of the oldest bodhisattvas and is regarded as powerful, especially in the Pure Land school, where he takes an important role in the Longer Sukhāvatīvyūha Sūtra. He is often depicted in a trinity with Amitābha and Avalokiteśvara (Guanyin), especially in Pure Land Buddhism.

In the Śūraṅgama Sūtra, Mahāsthāmaprāpta tells of how he gained enlightenment through the practice of nianfo, or continuous pure mindfulness of Amitābha, to obtain samādhi. In the Amitayurdhyana Sutra, Mahāsthāmaprāpta is symbolized by the moon while Avalokiteśvara is represented by the sun.

In the Introductory chapter of the Lotus Sutra, Mahāsthāmaprāpta is present among the 80,000 bodhisattva mahāsattvas who assemble on Mount Gṛdhrakūṭa to hear the Buddha's preaching of the Wonderful Dharma of the Lotus Flower Sutra. The Buddha also addresses Mahāsthāmaprāpta in chapter 20 of the Lotus Sutra to tell of the Buddha's past life as the Bodhisattva Sadāparibhūta ("Never Despising"), a monk who was abused and reviled by arrogant monks, nuns, laymen, and laywomen when he paid them respect by saying they would all become Buddhas. The Buddha explains to Mahāsthāmaprāpta how these arrogant people were punished, but are now bodhisattvas present in the assembly on the path to Enlightenment. The Buddha then praises the great strength of the Lotus Sutra thus: “O Mahāsthāmaprāpta, know that this Lotus Sutra will greatly benefit the bodhisattva mahāsattvas and lead them to highest, complete enlightenment. For this reason, after the Tathāgata’s parinirvāṇa the bodhisattva mahāsattvas should always preserve, recite, explain, and copy this sutra.”

China
Yìnguāng, a teacher of Pure Land Buddhism, was widely considered to be a manifestation of Mahāsthāmaprāpta based on the accounts of two people: 
1. Huìchāo, a former Christian who had never heard of him before
2. Běnkōng, a Buddhist monk and former student
Both of these figures had independent dreams regarding the situation.

Japan
In Japan, Mahāsthāmaprāpta is associated with the temple guardians Kongō Rikishi.

He is recognized as one of the Thirteen Buddhas.

Mantra
(Sanskrit): Namaḥ samantabuddhānāṃ, jaṃ jaṃ saḥ svāhā(Homage to all Buddhas! Jaṃ jaṃ saḥ! svāhā)

(Chinese):

Ǎn sàn rán rán suōpóhē (唵・散・髯・髯・娑婆訶)

(Japanese):(Shingon) On san zan saku sowaka (オン・サン・ザン・サク・ソワカ)(Tendai) On sanzen zensaku sowaka (オン・サンゼン・ゼンサク・ソワカ)

References

Bibliography
 Getty, Alice (1914). The gods of northern Buddhism, their history, iconography, and progressive evolution through the northern Buddhist countries, Oxford: The Clarendon press, p.100.

Bodhisattvas
Buddhism in China
Pure Land Buddhism